The 2008-09 V-League season was the 5th season of the V-League, the highest professional volleyball league in South Korea. The season started on 22 November 2008 and finished on 14 April 2009. Cheonan Hyundai Capital Skywalkers were the defending champions in the men's league and Incheon GS Caltex KIXX the defending female champions.

Teams

Men's clubs

Women's clubs

Regular season

League table (Male)

League table (Female)

Play-offs

Bracket (Male)

Bracket (Female)

Top Scorers

Men's

Women's

Player of the Round

Men's

Not awarded

Women's

Not awarded

Final standing

Men's League

Women's League

References

External links
 Official website 

2008 in volleyball
2009 in volleyball
V-League (South Korea)